Maillé-Brézé is a  (escorteur d'escadre) of the French Navy. She was built by Arsenal de Lorient in Lorient, commissioned on 4 May 1957 and named after the French admiral Jean Armand de Maillé-Brézé (1619–1646).

History 
On 2 March 1962, Maillé-Brézé, along with another four destroyers, landed fresh troops at Algiers to fight the OAS upsurge. Assisted by her sister ship , she was about to shell the OAS-held quarter of Bab-el-Oued when a counter-order called the operation off. The destroyers instead took battle stations close to the shore as a deterrent.

In 1988 she was decommissioned and became a museum ship in Nantes. She has been listed as a monument historique by the French Ministry of Culture since October 1991.

On 21 February 2016, director Christopher Nolan announced plans to feature the ship in his then upcoming World War II film Dunkirk. In the film, she portrayed two British destroyers – sister ships  and  – by simultaneously carrying the D36 pennant number of Vivacious on her port side and Vanquishers pennant D54 on her starboard side.

References
 Conway's All the World's Fighting Ships 1947-1995

External links

  Maillé-Brézé naval museum, Nantes
 Roll of Honour

Cold War naval ships of France
T 47-class destroyers
Ships built in France
Museum ships in France
Destroyers of the Cold War
1953 ships